Suniket Bingewar (born 21 November 1993) is an Indian cricketer. He made his first-class debut for Vidarbha in the 2018–19 Ranji Trophy on 7 January 2019.

References

External links
 

1993 births
Living people
Indian cricketers
Vidarbha cricketers
Place of birth missing (living people)